The Narhan Estate or Narhan Raj was a medieval dynasty and later a zamindari (estate) of Bhumihar during the British Raj in modern-day Bihar, in erstwhile Darbhanga district (now in Samastipur). It was spread in the district of Darbhanga, Muzaffarpur, Munger and Patna with an area of 57,282 acres. The estate was so called because the family residence was at Narhan village of Samastipur.

See also
Zamindars of Bihar

References

Zamindari estates
History of Bihar